Esporte Clube Pelotas, more commonly referred to as Pelotas, is a professional football club based in Pelotas, Rio Grande do Sul, Brazil. Founded in 1908, it plays in the Série D, the fourth tier of Brazilian football, as well in the Campeonato Gaúcho, the state of Rio Grande do Sul's premier state league, holding home games at Estádio Boca do Lobo, with a 23,336-seat capacity.

The club competed several times in the Campeonato Brasileiro Série B and in the Campeonato Brasileiro Série C, and won the Campeonato Gaúcho in 1930. Esporte Clube Pelotas women's football team competed in the 2008 Copa do Brasil de Futebol Feminino.

History
The club was founded on October 11, 1908, after two clubs from Pelotas, Club Sportivo Internacional and Football Club, merged. In 1930, Pelotas won the Campeonato Gaúcho, beating Grêmio in the final.

In 1983, Pelotas won the Campeonato Gaúcho Second Level. In 1988, Pelotas competed in the Campeonato Brasileiro Série B for the first time, but was eliminated in the first stage. In 1989, the club competed again in the Série B, being eliminated in the first stage again.

In 1995, 1996 and in 1998, Pelotas competed in the Campeonato Brasileiro Série C, being eliminated in the first stage in all three seasons. In 2003, the club competed again in the Série C, where they were eliminated by RS Futebol in the third stage of the competition. In the same year, Pelotas competed in the Copa do Brasil, being eliminated in the cup's first round, by Guarani.

In 2008, the club won the Copa FGF for the first time, after beating Cerâmica in the final, thus qualifying to the same season's Recopa Sul-Brasileira, and the following season's Campeonato Brasileiro Série D. The club was eliminated in the Recopa Sul-Brasileira in the semifinals 2–0, by Atlético Sorocaba.

Achievements
Campeonato Gaúcho: 1
1930
Runners-up (5): 1932, 1945, 1951, 1956, 1960

Copa FGF: 2
2008, 2019

Campeonato Gaúcho Série A2: 2
1983, 2018

Recopa Gaúcha: 2
2014, 2020

Super Copa Gaúcha: 1
2013

Copa Sul-Fronteira: 1
2013

Campeonato Citadino de Pelotas: 18
1913, 1915, 1916, 1925, 1928, 1930, 1932, 1933, 1939, 1944, 1945, 1951, 1956, 1957, 1958, 1960, 1981, 1996

Women's football team
Esporte Clube Pelotas women's football team competed in the 2008 Copa do Brasil de Futebol Feminino, but was eliminated in the first round by Kindermann, of Caçador, Santa Catarina. In the first leg, the club was beaten 5–0, then in the second leg the club was defeated again, 3–0.

Rivals
Pelotas's rivals are Brasil de Pelotas and Farroupilha. The first derby is known as Bra-Pel, while the second derby is known as Far-Pel.

Stadium
The club usually plays its home games at Estádio Boca do Lobo, which is a stadium located in Pelotas, and it has a maximum capacity of 23,336 people.

Current squad

References

External links
 Esporte Clube Pelotas official website

 
Association football clubs established in 1908
Women's football clubs in Brazil
Football clubs in Rio Grande do Sul
1908 establishments in Brazil